''All Thats second season ran from October 7, 1995, to March 30, 1996. This season contained 21 episodes plus a Good Burger special episode.

This season is similar to season one, because this season stars the same cast members and is also taped in Orlando, Florida. After the next season ended the show moved out of Florida and moved to Nickelodeon on Sunset (formerly The Aquarius Theater) in Hollywood, California. Season 2 is also the final season for Angelique Bates, whose contract with the show was not renewed.

The intro for the second season is the same as the first season.

The producers thought that Mitchell and Thompson had good chemistry on the show together. From there, the duo would begin starring on their own show, Kenan & Kel. The show debuted shortly after this season ended, with Mitchell and Thompson performing on both shows and doing other promotional work for the network.

CastRepertory players'''

 Angelique Bates
 Lori Beth Denberg
 Katrina Johnson
 Kel Mitchell
 Alisa Reyes
 Josh Server
 Kenan Thompson

Notes

Episodes

Special

References

1995 American television seasons
1996 American television seasons
All That seasons